The International Journal of Meteorology is a bimonthly science magazine on meteorology and severe weather, particularly that of the United Kingdom and Europe. It is a semi-professional non-profit publication with a mix of academic and amateur articles. It is published by Artetech Pub. Co. for TORRO.

See also
 Storm Track
 Weatherwise

External links
 

Bi-monthly magazines published in the United Kingdom
English-language magazines
Magazines established in 1975
Science and technology magazines published in the United Kingdom